Kushi is a 2000 Indian Tamil-language romantic comedy film written and directed by S. J. Suryah and produced by A. M. Rathnam. The film featured Vijay and Jyothika in the prominent roles, while Vijayakumar, Shilpa Shetty, Mumtaj, Vivek and Nizhalgal Ravi and others in the supporting roles. The film's cinematography was done by Jeeva, while music was composed by Deva. The film was released on 19 May 2000. Kushi was remade in Telugu as Kushi, in Hindi as Khushi, and in Kannada as Eno Onthara. Jyothika went on to win the Filmfare Best Actress Award in Tamil and Cinema Express Award for Best Sensational Actress at the Cinema Express Awards, for her performance.

Plot 
The movie begins with the birth of the protagonists, Shiva and Jennifer "Jenny" aka Selvi, in Calcutta and Kuttralam in Tirunelveli district of Tamil Nadu respectively. During the course of their childhood, they encounter each other a couple a times, though both don't know each other. When Shiva turns 21, he decides to pursue his higher studies in Canada, much to the disappointment of his mother, who is worried about him and wants him to stay in Calcutta. But while on the way to the airport, he meets with an accident and fractures his leg, forcing him to give up his dreams of studying abroad. At the same time, Jenny wants to pursue her post-graduation, but this is opposed by her father Pandiyan, who wants her to get married. But when Jenny's marriage gets cancelled as the groom runs away on the night before the wedding to elope with his lover, Pandiyan agrees to Jenny pursuing higher studies, on the condition that she gets married once she completes her education.

Shiva and Jenny both enroll in Madras Christian College, but in different classes. They meet each other at a temple and soon become close friends. Shiva's friend Babu is in love with Jenny's friend Shanthi. They both work together to unite their friends. But one day, Jenny catches Shiva staring at her waist while she is studying. A heated argument ensues, following which both Shiva and Jenny end their friendship.

Shiva and Jenny try to avoid each other, but can't as Shanthi's father Ambareesh, a powerful and influential industrialist and politician, has found out about his daughter's relationship with Babu, and goes to great lengths to avoid the couple from meeting each other. Shiva and Jenny are forced to work together to help Babu and Shanthi meet each other, despite Ambareesh's opposition. When Shiva is caught trying to sneak Babu into Shanthi's house, Ambareesh sends his men to attack Shiva. When one of the men attempt to stab Shiva, Jenny attempts to save Shiva, but in the process she cuts her hand and loses consciousness due to heavy bleeding. Shiva gets Jenny admitted in hospital, where she soon recovers. It is at this stage that both Shiva and Jenny realise they are in love with each other, but refuse to admit it. Shiva pretends to accept the sexual overtures of the college bombshell Anita, just to make Jenny jealous.

Meanwhile, Ambareesh tries to get Shanthi forcibly married to someone else. Shiva finds out and sneaks Shanthi out of the wedding hall, thus stopping the wedding. Shanthi and Babu get married at a register office with the support of Shiva and Jenny. Before leaving for their honeymoon, Babu and Shanthi advise them to sort out their relationship. When both Shiva and Jenny complete their post-graduation and leave for their respective hometowns, they attempt to contact each other by phone to declare their love, but fail. Shiva rushes to the Chennai Egmore railway station (where Jenny is to board a train to Tirunelveli), while at the same time, Jenny goes to the Chennai Central railway station (where Shiva is to board a train to Calcutta). They miss each other, but they write a letter declaring their love for each other and hand it over to their co-passengers on the train which they are respectively going to board. Jenny reaches her village the following morning in a sad mood, but soon is in for a surprise; she is to marry none other than Shiva that day. Shiva had read Jenny's letter and then informed Pandiyan about their relationship, who agreed to get them married. The movie ends with Shiva and Jenny happily hugging and kissing each other.

Cast

Production 
After watching the premiere show of Vaali, Rathnam offered S. J. Suryah an opportunity to direct his next venture with Vijay and Jyothika being signed on soon after. Jyothika was cast as the female lead after S. J. Suryah's  Vaali.  Vijay began shooting for the film during the same time he was shooting Fazil's Kannukkul Nilavu and revealed how hard it had been to shift between the two characters he was portraying.

Early reports indicated that the film would portray an illicit relationship where a young widowed mother (Mumtaz) would lust for the lover (Vijay) of her own daughter (Jyothika). The producer rubbished the rumors claiming that the film would be a romantic comedy.

The producers initially readied themselves to release the film on April 14, 2000 but pushed dates back to accommodate the release of bigger budget ventures such as Mani Ratnam's Alaipayuthey and Rajiv Menon's Kandukondain Kandukondain. The film eventually released on 19 May 2000.

Release 
Rediff.com felt that "overall, the light, airy romance of Kushi works just right for the holiday season, with an appeal calculated for the teen and family audiences", praising the director's story-telling. Entertainment portal Bizhat.com gave the film a below average review and claimed that the film "does not justify the title in any way nor does it come anywhere near his first" and that it "is interesting in the beginning, but monotonous after a time as the narration gets stuck in a groove". Ananda Vikatan rated the film 40 out of 100.

The Hindu featured the film as runner-up in their list of top Tamil films in 2000, placing it behind Vikraman's Vanathai Pola.

Awards
Jyothika went on to win the Best Actress Award Category, at several Award functions for her performance in the film. Deva won the Tamil Nadu State Film Award for Best Music Director in 2000 for his work in the film along with his work in Uyirile Kalanthathu and Sandhitha Velai.

Remakes and legacy
In 2001, A. M. Rathnam re-signed Surya to direct the Telugu version of the film, also titled Kushi. The film starring Pawan Kalyan and Bhumika Chawla also similarly won positive reviews and commercial success. Surya also directed the Hindi version of the film in 2003 as Khushi for producer Boney Kapoor, with Fardeen Khan and Kareena Kapoor starring. The success of the lead pair's chemistry prompted Vijay and Jyothika to team up again in 2003 for Thirumalai, while the director and actor briefly reunited for a project titled Puli in 2005, before Vijay opted out. In an interview prior to the release of Anbe Aaruyire (2005), Surya revealed that the film was "like a sequel to Kushi".

Soundtrack 

The soundtrack of the film was composed by Deva, while Vairamuthu penned the lyrics for the songs. "Mottu Ondru" was based on "Why You Wanna Trip on Me" by Michael Jackson, and "Oh Vennila" is based on the Portuguese song "Canção do Mar" sung by Dulce Pontes for Primal Fear (1996). The songs "Macarena Macarena", "Megam Karukuthu", and "Oru Ponnu Onnu" were reused as "Macarina Macarina", "Megham Karigenu", and "Oka Konte Pillane" in the Telugu film Naaga (2003), which also had the music composed by Deva.

References

External links 

2000 films
2000 romantic comedy films
2000s Tamil-language films
Films directed by S. J. Suryah
Films scored by Deva (composer)
Films shot in Kolkata
Films shot in Tirunelveli
Indian romantic comedy films
Tamil films remade in other languages